Lambertus de Monte, also Lambertus de Monte Domini or Lambert of Cologne (c. 1430/5–1499), was a medieval scholastic and Thomist.

Originally from 's-Heerenberg (Monte Domini), he went to the University of Cologne in 1450, where he was taught by his uncle Gerhardus de Monte, and received his Master of Arts in 1454, holding an arts professorship there from 1455 until 1473, when he became a doctor of theology. He then taught in the faculty of theology until his death.

He wrote several Thomist commentaries on Aristotle, including the Physics, De anima, and the logica nova, most of which were printed in Cologne during his lifetime or shortly thereafter. He was a defender of the Thomistic interpretation of Aristotle against that of Albert the Great and his followers. He was a member of the Schola Coloniensis of Thomists. Notably, he argued for Aristotle's salvation against the scholarly consensus that Aristotle was in Hell. He also wrote copulata (introductory logical analysis) of Peter of Spain. Besides Thomas and Gerhardus, he was influenced by Henry of Gorkum, Gerhardus' teacher. After Henry and Gerhardus, he was the third doctor of the bursa Montana, a college of students and faculty living in common.

Works
Copulata totius novae logicae Aristotelis
Copulata super libros De anima Aristotelis ("Expositio ... circa tres libros De anima Aristotelis"), first published 1485, 1492
Compilatio commentaria ... in octo libros Aristotelis De physico ("Prohemium Phisicorum"), first published 1493, 1498
Copulata omnium tractatuum Petri Hispani etiam (syncategorematum et) parvorum logicalium ac trium modernorum secundum doctrinam Thomae Aquinatis cum textu
De salvatione Arestotelis,  first published c. 1498

References
Chroust, Anton-Hermann. 1945. Contribution to the Medieval Discussion: Utrum Aristoteles Sit Salvatus. Journal of the History of Ideas, 6(2), 231–238.
Duhem, Pierre; Roger Ariew, ed. and trans. 1985. Medieval Cosmology: Theories of Infinity, Place, Time, Void, and the Plurality of Worlds. Chicago: University of Chicago Press. .
Lagerlund, Henrik. 2000. Modal Syllogistics in the Middle Ages. BRILL, .
Michael, Emily. 2003. Renaissance Theories of Body, Soul, and Mind. Psyche and Soma: Physicians and Metaphysicians on the Mind-Body Problem from Antiquity to Enlightenment. John P. Wright and Paul Potter, edd. Oxford: Oxford University Press, .

1430s births
1499 deaths
15th-century philosophers
Latin commentators on Aristotle
15th-century Latin writers